Martilou "Marti" Malloy (born June 23, 1986 in Oak Harbor, Washington) is a female judoka from the United States.

Career

Marti Malloy first made a name for herself in the senior rankings as a 16-year-old when she claimed a gold medal in her first senior international competition the 2002 Rendez-Vous Canada where she defeated a tough field, including both a 2000 Olympian and the previous year's U.S. National Champion, as well as top athletes from Canada and Great Britain.

After high school, she relocated to San Jose State University where she balanced training for the 2012 Olympic Games while pursuing a degree in Advertising/Marketing.  She eventually graduated from SJSU in 2010.

In 2005, she continued her success at both the junior and senior levels, winning a silver medal at the Judo U.S. Open and becoming the only U.S. athlete to win gold at the Junior Pan American Championships.

In 2007, she moved up from 57 kg to 63 kg where she placed ninth at the World Championships.  Although she competed at the 2007 Pan American Games as a 63 kg player, she moved back down to 57 kg that year to win her first Senior National title in that division.

In 2009, she added a second Senior National title and won the World Team Trials to compete on her second Senior World Team.

In 2010, she won her first big international medal at the Pan American Judo Championships and defended her Senior National title from previous year.

In 2012, she won bronze at the 2012 Summer Olympics in the class -57 kg, scoring an ippon in her last match with a kouchi gari.  On her way to winning her bronze medal she beat Telma Monteiro in her first match, then Yadinys Amaris and Irina Zabludina in the quarterfinal, before losing to Corina Caprioriu in the semifinal.  In the repechage she beat Giulia Quintavalle to win the bronze medal.

In 2013, she won a silver medal at the World Judo Championships in Rio de Janeiro and a silver medal at the 2013 Tokyo Grand Slam.

In 2014, she won her first gold medal at the Pan American Judo Championships held in Miami. She also defeated the 2012 Olympic champion Kaori Matsumoto at the 2014 World Judo Championships by armbar, but did not place in the tournament.

Achievements

References

External links
 
 
 Marti Malloy at USA Judo
 

American female judoka
Living people
1986 births
People from Oak Harbor, Washington
Sportspeople from Washington (state)
San Jose State Spartans athletes
Judoka at the 2012 Summer Olympics
Judoka at the 2016 Summer Olympics
Olympic judoka of the United States
Olympic bronze medalists for the United States in judo
Medalists at the 2012 Summer Olympics
Pan American Games gold medalists for the United States
Pan American Games medalists in judo
Judoka at the 2015 Pan American Games
Medalists at the 2015 Pan American Games